From the Head is a 2011 American drama film written and directed by George Griffith. The film stars Griffith, Matthew Lillard, Jeffrey Doornbos and Samantha Lemole in the lead roles.

Plot 
A "micro-budgeted indie", From the Head was touted as the directorial debut of a “veteran strip club bathroom attendant” (Griffith). The movie portrays portraits of the men and women who populate a strip club and their effect on the resident bathroom attendant's psyche.

Cast 
 George Griffith as Shoes
 Matthew Lillard as Jimmy
 Jeffrey Doornbos as Gordy
 Samantha Lemole as Ruby
 Ahna O'Reilly as Lily
 Jon Polito as Vinnie
 James Urbaniak as Danny
 Amy Sloan as Sophia
 Giuseppe Andrews as Ramone

Reception 
In his 2018 autobiography, Room To Dream, director David Lynch called it a "beautiful" work and said: "George made a film called From The Head...and when I saw it I knew he'd be a great Ray Monroe" (in Twin Peaks).

The Hollywood Reporter said it was "far more interesting than a film set entirely in a bathroom has a right to be." Shockya gave it an overall B− rating, calling it "a movie of considerable if to-scale surprises."

References

External links
 
 

2011 films
American drama films
2011 drama films
2010s English-language films
2010s American films